Tommy Guerrero (born September 9, 1966) is an Indigenous American musician, composer, and professional skateboarder.

Early life
Guerrero was born in San Francisco, California. He is of Ohlone-native, Chilean, and Filipino descent from his father's side.

Career

Skateboarding
As a teenager, Guerrero was one of the prominent members of the Bones Brigade, Powell Peralta's professional skateboarding team that was successful during the 1980s. He was well known for his relaxed style of street skateboarding and his Bones Brigade footage was primarily filmed in his hometown of San Francisco—the videos Future Primitive, The Search for Animal Chin, Public Domain, and Ban This all featured the street skateboarding of Guerrero. After riding for Powell Peralta, Guerrero and Jim Thiebaud, a hometown friend and Powell Peralta teammate, started the skateboarding company "Real".

Music

After his success in the world of skateboarding, Guerrero decided to pursue his musical interests and was a member of the skate rock band Free Beer and the instrumental post-rock group Jet Black Crayon, in addition to releasing many albums under his own name. Guerrero's music touches on multiple genres, including rock, hip hop, funk, soul, and jazz.

The skateboarding video game Skate has featured numerous unreleased compositions that were written and recorded by Guerrero. One of Guerrero's songs, "Organism", was featured in the 2005 video game Tony Hawk's American Wasteland.

Awards and accolades
In 2004, Rolling Stone magazine named Guerrero's third studio album, Soul Food Taqueria (2003), #2 on its 2003 "Best of" list.

At the 2013 15th Annual Transworld SKATEboarding Awards, Guerrero was the recipient of the "Legend" award—on the red carpet preceding the awards event, Guerrero stated:

"I'm super grateful, that anyone really cares, to be honest. Um ... conflicted; I'm not one to rest on my laurels and it's hard to accept accolades for something you did thirty years ago, you know? I'd rather be appreciated for what I do now, but I ... I ... I'm super grateful ... I can't believe it [street skateboarding in the 21st century]. I mean the technical aspect, and the consistency, combined with that, is mind-blowing ... but just where it's at now, is, is insane; I mean, what Rodney [Mullen] sort of started, with the technical aspect, to a whole another level, you know? Making it extremely gnarly, extremely technical ... I'd hate to be growing up skating now ..."

Following his receipt of the Transworld "Legend" award, Guerrero invited all "street skaters" onto the stage to stand alongside him at the Avalon Theater in Hollywood, California, US.

Discography

Albums
Loose Grooves & Bastard Blues (1998)
A Little Bit of Somethin''' (2000)Soul Food Taqueria (2003)From the Soil to the Soul (2006)Return of the Bastard (2008)Lifeboats & Follies  (2011)
 No Man's Land  (2012) - released in JapanThe Composer Series – Vol. 4 (2xCD) (unknown)Perpetual  (2015) - digital releaseRoad to Knowhere  (2018)Dub Session  (2019)Sunshine Radio  (2021)

Singles
"Backintheday" (1995)
"Junk Collector" (2001)
"Rusty Gears Lonely Years" / "Organism" (2001)
"Gettin' It Together" (2004)

EPsbackintheDay+fotraque 7inch  (2002)Year of the Monkey - EP (2005)

Concept albumsLiving Dirt (2010)

CollaborationsHoy Yen Ass'n (collaboration with former Jet Black Crayon member Gadget) (2000)
 Guerrero y Gonzales – (What It Isn't) (collaboration with Mark Gonzales, released in Japan) (2001)
Guerrero also compiled and mixed a DJ mix album for the Azuli Records' Late Night Tales / Another Late Night series in 2002, Another Late Night: Tommy Guerrero.
BLKTOP PROJECT - Blktop Project (collaboration with Ray Barbee, Matt Rodriguez, Doug Scharin and Chuck Treece) (2007)Lord Newborn and The Magic Skulls (collaboration with Money Mark and Shawn Lee)(2009).
BLKTOP PROJECT - Lane Change (collaboration with Ray Barbee, Matt Rodriguez, Doug Scharin and Chuck Treece) (2009)
BLKTOP PROJECT - Concrete Jungle'' (2016)

References

External links
Tommy Guerrero official site

Web page on Beggars Group
Tommy Guerrero discography at Discogs

American rock guitarists
American male guitarists
American skateboarders
Living people
Guitarists from San Francisco
Sportspeople from San Francisco
Quannum Projects artists
1966 births
Alternative Tentacles artists
American people of Chilean descent
20th-century American guitarists
20th-century American male musicians
Sportspeople from the San Francisco Bay Area
Artist skateboarders
American sportspeople of Filipino descent